The 2015 President's Cup (Maldives) Final was the 65th Final of the Maldives President's Cup.

Route to the final

Match

Details

See also
2015 President's Cup (Maldives)

References

President's Cup (Maldives) finals
Pres